The Chinese Ambassador to Seychelles is the official representative of the People's Republic of China to the Republic of Seychelles.

List of representatives

See also
China–Seychelles relations

References 

 
Seychelles
China